Rayner Matthews  is a former American "Old/Mid School" Bicycle Motocross (BMX) racer whose prime competitive years were from 1984 to 1991.

His nickname "Boss Man" was given to him while being a member of the Boss Racing team and the way he performed in his class (17 expert) during 1989.  During 1990 he participated in eighteen National Bicycle League (NBL) Nationals as an 18 Expert while riding for L & S Racing Products and White Bear Racing, he won fifteen mains. Also, during 1990 Rayner rode for both L & S Racing (for ABA) and White Bear Racing (for NBL) at the same time. He was known for his power and great gate starts. He was considered to be a super fast 18 Expert by Supercross BMX Products.

Racing career

Career factory and major bike shop sponsors

Note: This listing only denotes the racer's primary sponsors. At any given time a racer could have numerous ever changing co-sponsors. Primary sponsorships can be verified by BMX press coverage and sponsor's advertisements at the time in question. When possible, exact dates are given.

Amateur
ELF Racing Products: 1987
Boss Racing Products: 1988
L & S Racing Products: 1989
L & S Racing Products (ABA): 1990
White Bear Products (NBL): 1990

Professional
Supercross BMX Products: 1990
Goodtime Racing: 1990

Career bicycle motocross titles

Note: Listed are District, State/Provincial/Department, Regional, National, and International titles in italics. "Defunct" refers to the fact of that sanctioning body in question no longer existing at the start of the racer's career or at that stage of his/her career. Depending on point totals of individual racers, winners of Grand Nationals do not necessarily win National titles. Series and one off Championships are also listed in block.

Amateur
National Bicycle Association (NBA)
None
National Bicycle League (NBL)
1985 Delaware State Champion
1987 16 & Over Open Grandnational (first racer to win this race at the age of 16)
1988 17 Expert Grandnational Champion
American Bicycle Association (ABA)
None

Professional
National Bicycle Association (NBA)

National Bicycle League (NBL)

American Bicycle Association (ABA)

United States Bicycle Motocross Association (USBA)

International Bicycle Motocross Federation (IBMXF)

Pro Series Championships

Notable accolades
1987, he became the first BMX racer to win the 16 & Over Open NBL Grandnational at the age of sixteen.
1889, he participated in eighteen National Bicycle League (NBL) Nationals as an 18 Expert and won fifteen.

Racing habits and traits

Miscellaneous

BMX press magazine interviews and articles
"Ryner(Rayner) Matthews, Bios" BMX Action December 1990

References

1971 births
Living people
BMX riders